"Unconditional" is the second single from Australian pop-R&B singer Peter Andre's sixth studio album, Revelation (2009). The song is known for describing his relationship with ex-stepson Harvey Yorke.

Background
The song is very personal, written by Andre himself depicting his relationship with stepson Harvey Price, who is the son of his ex-wife Katie Price. Andre says that he "became a father before he became a dad", meaning that Harvey taught him how to become a dad before actually becoming a biological dad to Junior and Princess Tiaamii.

Music video
The video features Andre performing the song in an empty large cinema. As Andre is performing various images and clips of children with or without their parents are projected on the wall behind him. Towards the end of the song members of a choir come out and stand along the steps of the cinema and sing the song alongside Andre.

Track listing
 "Unconditional" (Radio Edit) - 3:37

Chart performance
The song debuted ahead of its release at #98. It rose eight places to #90 the following week, and then, in the week of its release, charted at #50, despite having been predicted as #1 by The Sun and Digital Spy, and many fans. The song fell to #80 the following week.

Release history

References

2009 singles
Peter Andre songs
Songs written by Peter Andre
2009 songs